Finckenstein may refer to:
Finck von Finckenstein, a German aristocratic family, Imperial Counts of the Holy Roman Empire and Counts in Prussia
 Finckenstein Palace, (Schloss Finckenstein) in former East Prussia, today Poland
 Kamieniec Suski, Poland,  prior to 1945: Finckenstein a village in former East Prussia
 Treaty of Finckenstein (1807)
 Finckenstein coat of arms
 Finkenstein am Faaker See, town in Carinthia in Austria from where the Finck von Finckenstein family originally comes from according to the Imperial Count Diploma
 Burgruine Finkenstein, the Finkenstein ruined castle in Carinthia, Austria

Prussian nobility
German noble families

pl:Finck von Finckenstein
ru:Список генерал-фельдмаршалов Германии